The Found FBA-2 is a 1960s Canadian four/five-seat cabin monoplane that was produced by Found Aircraft.

Design and development
The Found FBA-2 is an all-metal development of the company's first design, the Found FBA-1. The prototype first flew on 11 August 1960. It is a high-wing monoplane with a fixed tricycle undercarriage. The production version was to be the Found FBA-2B but the aircraft was produced with a conventional tail-wheel landing gear as the Found FBA-2C. The first production FBA-2C first flew on 9 May 1962. It is powered by an Avco Lycoming O-540-A1D engine and had a slightly longer cabin and enlarged cabin doors than the prototype. Originally, float or ski landing gear was available through third parties, and later became a factory option. Production ended in 1965 to concentrate on building the newer and larger Centennial 100. Thirty-four had been built.

Bush Hawk-XP
In 1996 the design was acquired by Found Aircraft Development who developed an improved model the  FBA-2C2 Bush Hawk-XP. This model was certified by Transport Canada in March, 1999 and by the Federal Aviation Administration in March, 2000. This version was manufactured between 2000-2007, after which it was replaced by a new version of the same basic airframe designated the Expedition E350 and the Expedition E350XC.

Expedition E350

The E350 is an evolutionary development of the basic FBA-2 aimed at the personal use market. The Expedition E350 was FAA type certified in December 2008. The aircraft can be equipped with four or five seats and has a full fuel payload in excess of 900 pounds. The E350 has been designed with rugged landing gear for operating from unprepared surfaces and has STOL performance.

Pacific Aerospace acquired the E-350 program in early 2016 from Found Aircraft. In September 2016, the E-350 Expedition tooling was shipped to its Hamilton, New Zealand plant. Pacific Aerospace planned to relaunch production of the five-seat type in the first half of 2017, but this date was not achieved. It is also planned to produce the E-350 in its joint venture plant in China with Beijing General Aviation Company. The joint venture will be known as Beijing Pan-Pacific Aerospace Technology.

Variants
FBA-2
Prototype, one built.
FBA-2C
Initial production variant, 26 built.
FBA-2C1 Bush Hawk 300
Improved variant with a 300hp Lycoming IO-540L, one built.
FBA-2C1 Bush Hawk XP
Production variant of the Bush Hawk 300, 31 built.
FBA-2C2 Bush Hawk 300XP
Minor changes, 6 built.
FBA-2C3 Expedition E350
Tricycle landing gear first flown in 2006, 3 built.
FBA-2C4 Expedition E350XC
Tail-wheel, one built.
FBA-2D
Proposed variant powered by a 290hp Lycoming engine, not built.

Specifications (FBA-2C)

References

Citations

Bibliography
 The Illustrated Encyclopedia of Aircraft (Part Work 1982-1985). London: Orbis Publishing.

1960s Canadian civil utility aircraft
High-wing aircraft
Single-engined tractor aircraft
Aircraft first flown in 1960